Fouad Yazgi (9 October 1932 – 25 October 1998) was an Egyptian sprinter. He competed in the men's 4 × 100 metres relay at the 1952 Summer Olympics.

References

1932 births
1998 deaths
Athletes (track and field) at the 1952 Summer Olympics
Egyptian male sprinters
Egyptian male hurdlers
Olympic athletes of Egypt